Adolphus Henry "Buck" Hatcher (May ll, 1896 – November 7, 1987) was an American college football player.

University of Tennessee
Hatcher was a prominent tackle for the Tennessee Volunteers football teams of the University of Tennessee from 1915 to 1916 and 1919 to 1920 . He once kicked a 52-yard field goal against Sewanee. At Tennessee, he was a member of Sigma Alpha Epsilon.

1916
Tennessee upset Vanderbilt 10 to 6 in 1916. Hatcher played at quarterback; his also punting contributed significantly, outpunting Tom Zerfoss by 15 yards consistently. The New York Herald ranked Hatcher as the season's premier punter. Tennessee finished undefeated and ranked with Georgia Tech as Southern Intercollegiate Athletic Association (SIAA) co-champions.

1919
A steady rain hindered the 1919 Tennessee–Vanderbilt contest which ended as a 3 to 3 tie. Josh Cody scored on a 30-yard drop kick, and Hatcher later made a 25-yard drop kick.

1920
Hatcher was captain and selected All-Southern in 1920. He booted a 50-yard field goal against Sewanee.

References

External links
 

1896 births
1987 deaths
American football drop kickers
American football placekickers
American football punters
American football quarterbacks
American football tackles
Tennessee Volunteers football players
Tennessee Wesleyan Bulldogs football coaches
All-Southern college football players
People from Fayetteville, Tennessee
Coaches of American football from Tennessee
Players of American football from Tennessee